Maria Mercedes Cagigas Amendo (born 15 August 1979) is a road cyclist from Spain. She represented her nation between 1997 and 2005 at the UCI Road World Championships. She also competed in the women's individual road race at the 2000 Summer Olympics.

References

External links
 profile at Procyclingstats.com

1979 births
Living people
Spanish female cyclists
Olympic cyclists of Spain
Cyclists at the 2000 Summer Olympics
Cyclists from Cantabria